Dejan Peković (born 4 April 1973) is a Montenegrin former footballer who played as a striker.

Career
In his homeland, Peković played for Budućnost Podgorica (1993–1995) and Partizan (1995–1996) in the First League of FR Yugoslavia, before moving abroad to Belgian club Standard Liège (1997). He subsequently returned to Budućnost Podgorica (1997–98), before moving abroad for the second time and joining Mexican club Puebla (1998). Over the following years, Peković also played for Cypriot club Apollon Limassol (1999–2000), as well as for Hungarian clubs Tatabánya (2001) and Haladás (2004).

Personal life
Peković is the younger brother of basketball player Stevan Peković.

Honours
Partizan
 First League of FR Yugoslavia: 1995–96

References

External links
 

1973 births
Living people
Footballers from Podgorica
Serbia and Montenegro footballers
Montenegrin footballers
Association football forwards
FK Budućnost Podgorica players
FK Partizan players
Standard Liège players
Club Puebla players
Apollon Limassol FC players
FC Tatabánya players
Szombathelyi Haladás footballers
First League of Serbia and Montenegro players
Belgian Pro League players
Liga MX players
Cypriot First Division players
Nemzeti Bajnokság I players
Serbia and Montenegro expatriate footballers
Expatriate footballers in Belgium
Expatriate footballers in Mexico
Expatriate footballers in Cyprus
Expatriate footballers in Hungary
Serbia and Montenegro expatriate sportspeople in Belgium
Serbia and Montenegro expatriate sportspeople in Mexico
Serbia and Montenegro expatriate sportspeople in Cyprus
Serbia and Montenegro expatriate sportspeople in Hungary